Tim Albutat (born 23 September 1992) is a German professional footballer who plays as a defensive midfielder for German club Schalke 04 II.

Club career
Albutat made his professional debut in the Bundesliga on 11 May 2013 against SpVgg Greuther Fürth.

He joined MSV Duisburg for the 2014–15 season. He extended his contract on 12 June 2019.

After six years in Duisburg, he moved to KFC Uerdingen in the summer of 2020.

International career
Albutat made three appearances for the German U18 national team.

Career statistics

References

External links

Living people
1992 births
People from Rheingau-Taunus-Kreis
Sportspeople from Darmstadt (region)
German footballers
Association football midfielders
Germany youth international footballers
SC Freiburg players
SC Freiburg II players
MSV Duisburg players
MSV Duisburg II players
KFC Uerdingen 05 players
FC Schalke 04 II players
Bundesliga players
2. Bundesliga players
3. Liga players
Regionalliga players
Oberliga (football) players
Footballers from Hesse